R549 road may refer to:
 R549 road (Ireland)
 R549 (South Africa)